Wappach is a small river of Bavaria, Germany. It flows into the Saalach in Bad Reichenhall.

See also
List of rivers of Bavaria

Rivers of Bavaria
Rivers of Germany